Jill Aiko Otake (born October 3, 1973) is a United States district judge of the United States District Court for the District of Hawaii.

Biography 

Jill Otake was born on October 3, 1973, in Honolulu, Hawaii. She graduated from the 'Iolani School and earned a Bachelor of Science, cum laude, from Georgetown University, where she majored in the Russian language. Otake received her Juris Doctor from the University of Washington in 1998 and was selected for the Order of Barristers.

After graduating from law school, Otake clerked for Associate Justice Simeon R. Acoba, Jr. of the Supreme Court of Hawaii. She worked for five years as a Deputy Prosecuting Attorney in King County, Washington. Otake then spent nine years as a supervisor and as an Assistant United States Attorney for the Western District of Washington.

Immediately before becoming a judge, Otake was Special Counsel to the United States Attorney and Acting Chief of the Special Crime Section as an Assistant United States Attorney for the District of Hawaii. She was Deputy Chief of that office from 2014 to 2018.

Otake is a recipient of the Federal Bureau of Investigation Certificate of Recognition, Internal Revenue Service Excellence Award, and numerous U.S. Department of Justice Performance Awards. Otake was an instructor for the inaugural Hawaii Federal Trial Academy, sponsored by the Federal Bar Association and the United States District Court for the District of Hawaii.

Otake is co-chair of the Hawaii State Bar Association's Professionalism and Risk Management Committee and was also a volunteer attorney for Volunteer Legal Services Hawaii. She is also a mentor for Hawaii women lawyers. Otake has taught trial advocacy at Seattle University Law School; served as co-president of the Asian Bar Association of Washington; and served on the United States District Court for the District of Hawaii's Chief Probation Officer Selection Committee. She was a fellow of the 2016 Hawaii State Bar Association's Leadership Institute. She currently serves on the 'Iolani School Board of Governors.

Federal judicial service 

On December 20, 2017, President Donald Trump announced his intent to nominate Otake to serve as a United States District Judge of the United States District Court for the District of Hawaii. Otake was recommended to the White House by U.S. Senators Mazie Hirono and Brian Schatz. On December 21, 2017, her nomination was sent to the United States Senate. She was nominated to the seat vacated by Judge Susan Oki Mollway, who assumed senior status on November 6, 2015. The American Bar Association's Standing Committee on the Federal Judiciary rated Otake unanimously "Well Qualified." On March 7, 2018, a hearing on her nomination was held before the Senate Judiciary Committee. On April 12, 2018, her nomination was reported out of committee by voice vote. On August 1, 2018, her nomination was confirmed by voice vote. She received her judicial commission on August 3, 2018.

Personal life 

Otake's younger brother is Thomas "Tommy" Otake, a defense attorney practicing in Hawaii.

See also 
 List of Asian American jurists

References

External links 
 

1973 births
Living people
20th-century American lawyers
21st-century American lawyers
21st-century American judges
American jurists of Japanese descent
Assistant United States Attorneys
ʻIolani School alumni
Georgetown University alumni
Hawaii lawyers
Lawyers from Seattle
Judges of the United States District Court for the District of Hawaii
Seattle University faculty
State attorneys
United States district court judges appointed by Donald Trump
University of Washington School of Law alumni
Washington (state) lawyers
20th-century American women lawyers
21st-century American women lawyers
21st-century American women judges
Asian conservatism in the United States